Delthota is a small town in Kandy District, Sri Lanka. The town is located near to Nuwara Eliya District, and has a climate similar to that found in Nuwara Eliya, which often requires to wear a jacket to keep yourself warm.

People in Delthota  
Sinhalese, Tamils and Muslims live together in Delthota.  It has a friendly, multicultural environment. Delthota is a remote village, so strangers are easily spotted.

Places to visit from Delthota  
Delthota is a small town in Kandy district yet has number of attractions.
 The remains of Sir. James Taylor (Ceylon)'s House.
 First tea Estate in Sri Lanka
 First tea factory in Sri Lanka
 Nillamba Buddhist meditation center

Delthota Buddhist Temples 
There are many Buddhist temples in the Delthota area.

 Sri Jinendrarama viharaya - Uda Delthota
 Sri Ratahanasrama Viharaya - Delthota
 Sri Ashokarama Viharaya - Galaha Estate - Galaha
 Sri Sanghabhi Buddhist Centre - Sandaruanpura - Delthota
 Sri Sudharmarama Viharaya - Bopitya Estate - Delthota
 Bauddha Madyasthanaya - Bawlana Estate - Bawlana
 Sri Vijayarama Viharaya - Maaussawa
 Sri Bodhirukkarama Viharaya - Kolambissa
 Bogahathenna Viharasthanaya - Nawaneliya
 Sri Sudharshanarama Viharaya - Kandegama
 Sri Abhayaingharama Viharaya - Gabadagama
 Sri Jayasumanarama Viharaya - Loolkandura
 Bauddha wivekasrama Viharaya - naaranghinna
 Sri Sumithrama Viharaya - Galaha

Travelling to Delthota  
28 km from Peradeniya, via Galaha.

Populated places in Kandy District